NGC 4589 is an elliptical galaxy located in the Draco constellation. It is at a distance of about 108 million light-years away from the Earth. It is known by its designations PGC 42139 or UGC 7797.

In the center of NGC 4589 lies a supermassive black hole. The galaxy hosted a supernova called 2005cz. NGC 4589 was discovered by astronomer William Herschel on November 22, 1797.

See also 
 List of NGC objects (4001–5000)

Gallery

References

External links 
 
 
 

Elliptical galaxies
4589
Draco (constellation)
042139